Live at the Hollywood Palladium, December 15, 1988 is a live album by Keith Richards and was released on 10 December 1991, in the United States and 24 February 1992, in the United Kingdom. Recorded during the brief American tour, the only leg of the shows, in support of Talk Is Cheap in late 1988, Richards is supported by a set of musicians and friends dubbed "The X-Pensive Winos". The Winos included Richards, Waddy Wachtel, Steve Jordan, Charley Drayton, Ivan Neville, and Sarah Dash. Longtime Rolling Stones contributor Bobby Keys also plays saxophone.

Half-joking at the end of the opening number that the Palladium's "a stage I've been thrown off many times", Richards was referring to Chuck Berry's concert there on January 21, 1972, when he tried to perform with his idol, but was purportedly kicked off for playing too loudly, though Berry later claimed he had not recognized Richards.

Richards' set during the tour was composed primarily of material from his solo debut album – he played nine of the eleven songs from the record – and also included many of his Rolling Stones vocal highlights, with "Happy", "Connection" and "Too Rude" appearing on the official release, though "Before They Make Me Run" and "Little T&A" only turned up on popular bootlegs such as L.A. Connection. And while Live at the Hollywood Palladium, December 15, 1988 does not include the full concert captured that evening, it does present "Time Is on My Side" sung by Sarah Dash. Unavailable is Richards singing "I Wanna Be Your Man".

Live at the Hollywood Palladium, December 15, 1988 was recorded, videotaped and ultimately released at the suggestion of Jane Rose, Richards tenured manager. Officially credited as Executive Producer, she encouraged Richards to consider the official release after showing the reluctant star bootlegs of inferior audio quality. The record dropped in North America for the Christmas buying season, in the wake of the Stones comeback Steel Wheels/Urban Jungle Tour, and well into pre-production for his second studio album Main Offender. Although it failed to chart, the album has sold over 100,000 copies in the United States alone.

The album includes several Rolling Stones songs, including "Too Rude" (from Dirty Work), "Time Is on My Side", "Happy" (from Exile on Main St.), and "Connection" (from Between the Buttons.)

Track listing
All songs by Keith Richards and Steve Jordan, except where noted.
"Take It So Hard" – 4:27
"How I Wish" – 4:05
"I Could Have Stood You Up" – 4:30
"Too Rude" (Lindon Roberts, Sly Dunbar, Robbie Shakespeare) – 7:46
"Make No Mistake" – 6:30
"Time Is on My Side" (Norman Meade) – 4:32
"Big Enough" – 3:46
"Whip It Up" – 5:35
"Locked Away" – 5:49
"Struggle" – 4:35
"Happy" (Mick Jagger, Keith Richards) – 7:08
"Connection" (Mick Jagger, Keith Richards) – 2:33
"Rockawhile" – 6:16

Personnel
Sarah Dash – backing vocals, percussion, lead vocals on "Time Is on My Side", and duet on "Make No Mistake"
Charley Drayton – bass guitar, backing vocals, and drums on "Take It So Hard" and "I Could Have Stood You Up"
Steve Jordan – drums, backing vocals, bass guitar on "Take It So Hard", and keyboards on "I Could Have Stood You Up"
Bobby Keys – saxophone
Ivan Neville – keyboards, backing vocals, guitar on "Happy", and bass guitar on "I Could Have Stood You Up"
Keith Richards – guitar and lead vocals
Waddy Wachtel – guitar and backing vocals

Charts

References

1991 live albums
Keith Richards albums
Virgin Records live albums